Wrinkles the Clown is a 2019 American documentary comedy horror film directed by Michael Beach Nichols. The film follows a man known as Wrinkles the Clown who lives in Naples, Florida. For a fee of "a few hundred dollars", he will attend birthdays, scare misbehaving kids, and prank people.

The film was released in the United States on October 4, 2019 by Magnet Releasing.

Premise 
In 2015, a video is uploaded to YouTube depicting a clown named Wrinkles emerging from beneath a young girl's bed. It quickly goes viral. In the following months, it is revealed that Wrinkles is a professional clown in Florida who offers his services to the parents of misbehaving children, showing up to frighten them unannounced as a deterrent to future bad behavior. Stickers bearing Wrinkles' face and phone number begin appearing all over Florida and thousands of people begin calling it for various reasons, from parents wanting to hire Wrinkles to people making death threats. Over the course of the next four years, Wrinkles becomes an object of folklore both locally in Florida and across the United States, with children routinely calling the number either alone or with friends as a sort of rite of passage. Additionally, further videos appear depicting Wrinkles either frightening people outside their homes or engaging in disturbing behavior, such as waving to motorists from a darkened roadside.

In 2019, Wrinkles agrees to allow a documentary crew to follow him in his daily life and explain his philosophy. Wrinkles is revealed as an elderly homeless man who lives in a van in the woods outside of Naples, Florida and spends much of his free time fishing, drinking, and going to strip clubs, occasionally using the money he makes from his appearances as Wrinkles to check into motels. He claims to have no personal ideology and states that he only works as Wrinkles for the money.

Discussions with Wrinkles are intercut with interviews with a variety of individuals discussing the phenomenon, including a psychologist who debates whether Wrinkles' behavior is abusive; folklore experts who compare Wrinkles to a contemporary Bloody Mary and other mythic rituals that figure prominently in American adolescence; a historian who explores the history of the evil clown trope, tying it back to Punch and Judy; and a professional clown unhappy with the recent negative attention that Wrinkles and the remake of Stephen King's It have brought to the profession. The documentary crew further discusses Wrinkles with a number of children around America who have been impacted by his videos, from a young girl who wishes to fight him to an aspiring horror filmmaker inspired by Wrinkles' YouTube videos to begin conceptualizing his own movies. The documentary crew also examines the Wrinkles phenomenon in the context of the 2016 clown sightings.

Midway through the documentary it is revealed that the man the crew has been following is in fact an actor named D.B. Lambert, hired by the "real" Wrinkles, a Florida performance artist, to portray Wrinkles' secret identity. Wrinkles explains that both characters were created as part of an elaborate art project. With his face blurred out, the real Wrinkles shows the documentary crew behind-the-scenes footage depicting the making of various Wrinkles videos; he further reveals that he has never actually gone to anyone's house, and that all the videos depicting Wrinkles frightening children were in fact made with the participation of actors. Wrinkles expresses satisfaction with the impact the project has had while contemplating its future, and the role it has had in contemporary American pop culture.

Cast 

 Benjamin Radford (as himself)
 D.B. Lambert (as himself and "Wrinkles the Clown")
 Unidentified performance artist known as Wrinkles the Clown (as himself)

Release

Critical response

On Metacritic, the film has a weighted average score of 53 out of 100, based on 8 critics, indicating "mixed or average reviews".

References

External links 
 
 
 
 
 

2019 films
2019 comedy horror films
2019 documentary films
American documentary films
Horror films about clowns
Topic Studios films
2010s English-language films
2010s American films